Mr. Show with Bob and David, also known as Mr. Show, is an American sketch comedy series starring and hosted by Bob Odenkirk and David Cross. It aired on HBO from November 3, 1995, to December 28, 1998.

Cross and Odenkirk introduced most episodes as semi-fictionalized versions of themselves, before transitioning to a mixture of on-stage sketches performed in front of a live audience and pre-taped segments. The show featured a number of alternative comedians as both cast members and writers, including Sarah Silverman, Paul F. Tompkins, Jack Black, Karen Kilgariff, Tom Kenny, Mary Lynn Rajskub, Brian Posehn, Jill Talley, Scott Aukerman, and Dino Stamatopoulos.

It was nominated for four Primetime Emmy Awards, as well as a Golden Satellite Award. The show is currently available on Tubi and HBO Max.

Format
Each episode of Mr. Show consists of a series of sketches, at times surreal, each one transitioning to the next by a link in a manner reminiscent of Monty Python's Flying Circus or The State. For example, a minor character in one sketch might return as the major character in the next.  Often, common themes or storylines are returned to at different times throughout an episode. As a premium cable show, its audience was limited. DVD editions, however, opened the show to a broad new audience.

Every episode begins with an individual introducing the hosts. This role was filled by Mary Lynn Rajskub in the first two seasons.  After her departure for personal reasons, the introduction was made by a random character from that week's episode.

Episode titles were mostly quotes from the episode. For example, "Bush Is a Pussy" is written on a T-shirt worn by one of the characters. One of the exceptions is "Eat Rotten Fruit from a Shitty Tree", which is a line in a song within the episode that was eventually performed as an instrumental.

Certain lines of dialogue are often repeated by different characters during the course of a single show. For example there was "I was on the eighteenth hole!" in "The Biggest Failure in Broadway History" and "Who let you in?" in the episode of the same name.

At the end of each episode's credits, a random celebrity is listed in the "Special Thanks" section. Examples include Rick Dees in the first episode and Greg Maddux in the third.

Episodes

Season 1 (1995)

Season 2 (1996)

Season 3 (1997)

Season 4 (1998)

Production
Odenkirk and Cross had both been involved in the sketch show The Ben Stiller Show, with Odenkirk as one of the actors and Cross a writer. The two found a common sense of humor and tried their hand at taking some of the ideas that did not work well on the show to a local comedy club. Their routines were very successful, leading Odenkirk's manager Bernie Brillstein to try to find a means to make them into a television show. HBO had already been scouting the pair, given the two's past roles in other influential comedies, including The Larry Sanders Show, and quickly greenlit the show, providing enough funds for a two-episode order. They managed to stretch the budget of the two-episode order to cover four episodes for the first season.

The show continued for three additional seasons. However, ahead of the fourth season, HBO rescheduled the show into a Monday midnight slot, which made it difficult to find, and resulted in poor ratings, leading to HBO to cancel the show after the fourth season.

Contributors
Mr. Show's main cast for the entire run consisted of David Cross, John Ennis, Tom Kenny, Bob Odenkirk, and Jill Talley. Cross, Ennis, and Odenkirk appeared in each season. Kenny left the show after the third season, returning for one episode of season four. Talley appeared in all episodes except for four towards the end of the third season. Jay Johnston, a featured performer throughout the series, was credited as a member of the main cast for the final episode of the show.

Main cast
David Cross
Bob Odenkirk
John Ennis
Tom Kenny (seasons 1–3, and episode #402)
Jill Talley
Jay Johnston (main season 4, previously featured)

Featured cast and frequent collaborators

Scott Adsit (season 4)
Scott Aukerman (season 2–4)
Jack Black (seasons 1–2)
Jay Johnston (seasons 1–4)
Karen Kilgariff (seasons 3–4)
Jerry Minor (episode #205, season 4)
Theresa Mulligan (episode #204, season 3)
Bill Odenkirk (seasons 1–4)
Brett Paesel (seasons 2–4)
B. J. Porter (episodes #205 and #307, season 4)
Brian Posehn (seasons 1–4)
Mary Lynn Rajskub (seasons 1–2)
Mark Rivers (season 4)
Sarah Silverman (episode #103, season 3)
Dino Stamatopoulos (seasons 2–4)
Becky Thyre (season 4)
Paul F. Tompkins (seasons 1–4)

Writing staff

Bob Odenkirk (episode #101–#410)
David Cross (episode #101–#410)
Jay Johnston (episode #203–#410)
Bill Odenkirk (episode #203–#410)
Dino Stamatopoulos (episode #203, #206–#401, #403–#410)
Paul F. Tompkins (episode #203–#310)
Brian Posehn (episode #204–#205, #301–#408)
Mike Stoyanov (episode #301–#305)
Mike Upchurch (episode #301–#310)
Scott Aukerman (episode #401–#410)
Jerry Collins (episode #401–#407)
B. J. Porter (episode #401–#410)
Eric Hoffman (episode #406–#410)

Contributing writers
Tom Kenny (episode #308)
Brent Forrester (episode #308, #404)
Brian Posehn (episode #410)

Reception
Mr. Show with Bob and David was nominated for a Primetime Emmy Award for Outstanding Writing for a Variety, Music or Comedy Program at the 50th Primetime Emmy Awards, losing to Dennis Miller Live, and also received a nomination for the song "How High The Mountain" in the category of Outstanding Music and Lyrics.  The following year it was renominated for Outstanding Writing, losing this time to The Chris Rock Show, and also received a Creative Arts Emmy Award nomination for lighting director Simon Miles.

At the 9th Golden Satellite Awards in 2004, the show's third season DVD set was nominated for "Best DVD Release of TV Shows."

In 2010, prompted by the announcement of IFC's plans to re-air Mr. Show, it was included in a short list of "TV's greatest cult comedy series" by The A.V. Club.

Related projects

Run Ronnie Run

Mr. Show also spawned a spin-off movie, Run Ronnie Run, which was shown at the 2002 Sundance Film Festival, but went straight-to-DVD. In an April 2004 article in Chunklet magazine,  Odenkirk noted numerous problems they had had with the film, blaming the film's director, Troy Miller, who "chose to freeze us out, hold us at arm's length and not let us influence the movie nearly on the scale that we should have."

Mr. Show Live: Hooray for America!
In September 2002, original cast members Bob Odenkirk, David Cross, John Ennis, Brian Posehn and Stephanie Courtney toured in a show called Mr. Show: Hooray for America!!!. The two-month stint included "distillations" of some of Mr. Show's sketches, such as "The Burgundy Loaf", and new material. In the stage show, the large fictitious mega-corporation Globo-Chem ("We own everything, so you don't have to!") sponsors David's stage persona to run for the presidency of the United States.
The tour included 16 large cities and college towns in North America: San Diego, Washington, D.C., Philadelphia, New York City, Boston, Ann Arbor, Chicago, Madison, Minneapolis, Los Angeles, San Francisco, Sacramento, Eugene, Portland, Seattle, and Vancouver.

Hollywood Said No!
In September 2013, Grand Central Publishing released Hollywood Said No!: Orphaned Film Scripts, Bastard Scenes, and Abandoned Darlings from the Creators of Mr. Show, a book of rejected scripts and unused Mr. Show sketches. The audiobook version included full cast readings by former Mr. Show performers and writers. One of the rejected scripts is the original version of Hooray for America!, which had earlier been adapted as part of the Mr. Show Live tour.

Mr. Show Zoomtacular Annual Business Call for Charity
During the COVID-19 pandemic in May 2020, Cross, Odenkirk and most of the show's supporting cast including Kenny, Talley, Johnston, Ennis, Aukerman, Posehn, Paesel, Rajskub, and Tompkins, created a Zoom-based streaming Mr. Show reunion event, the Mr. Show Zoomtacular Annual Business Call for Charity, with proceeds benefiting the LIFT charity. The event featured new sketches in the style of Mr. Show, as well as updates from the various cast members on their own current projects, and concluded with the cast and additional friends singing a cover of "Eat It" by "Weird Al" Yankovic, who also participated, that mocked a prior attempt to cover "Imagine" by Gal Gadot and other celebrities performed earlier.

Legacy
While the show was never viewed by a mass audience due to its premium cable broadcast,  it remains a highly influential piece of American sketch comedy. Many involved with the show have gone on to become staples of the American comedy landscape.

The Sarah Silverman Program was written by and stars Sarah Silverman, and features Jay Johnston and Brian Posehn. Arrested Development features David Cross as regular character Tobias Fünke; the series also had guest spots filled by Mr. Show alumni, such as Bob Odenkirk as a marriage counselor, Jerry Minor and Jay Johnston as gay cops, and John Ennis as a mall security guard. Jack Black had supporting roles in Mr. Show. Cross and Odenkirk would go on to work with Black on producing a show for HBO for the comedy band Tenacious D which would also feature Mr. Show alumnus Paul F. Tompkins.

In January 2011, IFC began airing 90-minute blocks of Mr. Show, The Ben Stiller Show, Action and The Larry Sanders Show three times per week. The programming block was often hosted by Mr. Show writer and actor Scott Aukerman, who also conducted new interviews with the shows' contributors and younger comedians who have been influenced by the shows. The song "Adam's Song" by American alternative rock band Blink-182 got its name as a tribute/reference to a sketch from the show about a band that writes a song by the same name with similar lyrical content. This was confirmed by Cross in an interview, who said "They were fans of the show and that was a knowing tribute that I thought was pretty cool."

David's Situation
Odenkirk and Cross reunited in 2008 to create the HBO pilot David's Situation, which was shot but never aired. The network gave the pair $400,000 to shoot a pilot (which was shot on the Everybody Loves Raymond soundstage), which appeared to go well during the taping; however, while Cross and Odenkirk were editing the episode, they felt it failed to "capture that same energy on screen." In an interview with Vanity Fair, Cross said, "We told them that we didn't want to do this show, we'd rather do Mr. Show 2.0. And they were like, 'Yeah, O.K., that's great, but the thing is, we don't have any more money for this year. But we'll figure out something next year.' And we never heard from them again."

Comedians and shows inspired by Mr. Show
Comedy duo Tim & Eric have said their program Tim and Eric Awesome Show, Great Job! was highly inspired by Mr. Show. Odenkirk served as the producer on Awesome Show as well as Tom Goes to the Mayor and The Birthday Boys.

Other sketch comedy shows whose creators have cited Mr. Show as an influence include Portlandia, Key & Peele, Kroll Show, People's Emergency Guide and Human Giant.

Revival

In April 2015, Netflix acquired Mr. Show and put in an order for four half-hour episodes and one hour-long "making-of" special.  The announcement was a followup to a Twitter post from Paul F. Tompkins teasing about "something new coming from the Mr. Show gang in the new year." W/ Bob & David premiered on November 13, 2015.

Characters

Odenkirk and Cross mostly avoided using recurring characters a la Saturday Night Live, but some characters made repeat appearances:

References

External links

 

1995 American television series debuts
1998 American television series endings
1990s American sketch comedy television series
1990s American surreal comedy television series
English-language television shows
HBO original programming
1995 establishments in California
Television series by Brad Grey Television
Television series by Sony Pictures Television